The Indian cricket team is scheduled to tour West Indies in July and August 2023 to play two Test, three One Day International (ODI) and three Twenty20 International (T20I) matches. The International Cricket Council (ICC) confirmed this FTP tour in their press release.

References

International cricket competitions in 2023
Indian cricket tours of the West Indies